Rita Hernández (born 16 March 1969) is a Spanish handball player. She competed in the women's tournament at the 1992 Summer Olympics.

References

1969 births
Living people
Spanish female handball players
Olympic handball players of Spain
Handball players at the 1992 Summer Olympics
Sportspeople from Las Palmas